The Primetime Emmy Award for Outstanding Costumes for a Variety, Nonfiction, or Reality Programming is presented as part of the Primetime Emmy Awards. To be eligible, the costumes must have been designed specifically for television.

Winners and nominations

1980s

1990s

2000s

2010s

2020s

Programs with multiple awards

3 awards
 RuPaul's Drag Race
 So You Think You Can Dance
 Tracey Takes On...

2 awards
 MADtv
 The Masked Singer 
 Portlandia

Programs with multiple nominations

11 nominations
 Saturday Night Live

7 nominations
 MADtv

6 nominations
 Dancing with the Stars

5 nominations
 RuPaul's Drag Race

4 nominations
 In Living Color
 Tracey Takes On...

3 nominations
 The Masked Singer 
 Portlandia

2 nominations
 Drunk History 
 The Smothers Brothers Comedy Hour

Notes

References

Outstanding Costumes for a Variety, Nonfiction or Reality Programming